Abdelilah Madkour (Arabic: عبد الإله مدكور; born 6 October 2000) is a Moroccan professional footballer who plays as a right-back for Botola club Raja Club Athletic.

References

Living people
2000 births
Moroccan footballers
Association football defenders
Raja CA players